Slow Recovery is the fourth release from Peter Baldrachi. After a long break between albums, Baldrachi released four singles beginning in 2015 and an EP in 2019. Slow Recovery was recorded by Craig Welsch, mixed by Benny Grotto, and mastered by Joe Lambert. The album features performances from Duke Levine (Bonnie Raitt, Mary Chapin Carpenter, Peter Wolf), Dave Mattacks (Fairport Convention, Paul McCartney, Brad Hallen (Susan Tedeschi, Aimee Mann, Roomful of Blues), and Milt Reder (Four Piece Suit, Barrence Whitfield) among many other Boston musicians. The album has received positive reviews with The Big Takeover calling it “his most affecting work to date” and Power Pop Station describing it as “brilliant and beautiful.” The title track was released as a single in January 2020.

Track listing

Personnel
 Peter Baldrachi –  Lead Vocals, Drums, Percussion
 Gary Rand –    - Electric & Acoustic Guitar, Lead Guitar, Electric Bass
 Ingrid Gerdes –   - Backing Vocals on all tracks
 Milt Reder –  Electric & Acoustic Guitar, Lead Guitar 
 Duke Levine –  Lead Guitar, Slide Guitar, Resonator, Mandolin
 Dana Flood –  Pedal Steel Guitar 
 Peter Linnane –  Piano, Hammond B3, Farfisa, Mellotron, Pump Organ
 Dave Mattacks –  Drums on In My Heart & Killing Time
 Brad Hallen –  Double Bass on Seasons & Bitter Pill; Electric Bass on Side By Side
 Dean Cassell –  Electric Bass on The Sweeping Hand of Love
 John Aruda –  Saxophone on Slow Recovery
 Scott Aruda –  Trumpet on Slow Recovery
 Corbin Smith –  Trumpet on Never Go Away
 Jay Stanley –   Congas, Percussion
 Benny Grotto –  Percussion on Slow Recovery
 Paul Wolstencroft –  Wurlitzer electric piano on Side By Side

Production notes
 Produced by Peter Baldrachi and Gary Rand 
 Recorded by Craig Welsch at Rear Window, Brookline, MA
 Additional recording by K.R. Mogenson and Corbin Smith at Kissy Pig, Allston, MA and by * * Andrew Clifford at Main Street Music, Brewer, ME
 Mixed by Benny Grotto at Mad Oak, Allston, MA
 Mastered by Joe Lambert at Joe Lambert Mastering, Jersey City, NJ
 Edited by Corbin Smith
 Layout and Design by Steven Jurgensmeyer

References

2020 albums
Peter Baldrachi albums